The Pensacola FC Women are an American soccer team based in Pensacola, Florida. Founded in 2011 as the Gulf Coast Texans, they play in the Gulf Coast Premier League.

History
The team was founded as Gulf Coast Texans in 2011. The team captured the 2012 WPSL title defeating Boston Aztec 4–0 in the final. The team reached the WPSL Final again in 2017, but fell short losing to Fire & Ice SC. In 2018 the first year playing as Pensacola FC, the team made the final again but this time losing to Seattle Sounders ladies 3-1 in 2018. In 2019 however playing against a star studded Utah Royals Reserve team, PFC were crowned Champions by a margin of 4-3 in the finals under the Helm of longstanding Head Coach David Kemp and assistants Jason Providence and Dean Logan. David Kemp was voted the coach of the year. In 2021 Pensacola FC moved to the UWS women's league in the Southeast Division where they were the league and conference champions. Head Coach Jason Providence was voted the Coach of the Year together with Emily Madril (FSU) being the defensive player of the year and Monigo Karnely (Mississippi State) being voted the offensive player of the year in the conference.  

They are affiliated with the men's soccer team Pensacola FC.

Stadium
 Ashton Brosnaham Stadium; Pensacola, FL (2013–present)

References

External links
 Club website
 @PensacolaFCWoSo on Twitter

Defunct soccer clubs in Florida
Sports in Pensacola, Florida
2017 establishments in Florida
Association football clubs established in 2017
Women's sports in Florida